Menkheperraseneb I was a high official under the reign of king (pharaoh) Thutmose III and Amenhotep II. He was a High Priest of Amun and therefore the most important religious official in his days.

Identity 
Menkheperraseneb was a son of the High Priest of Amun, Min-nakht (or Nakht-Min). Most possibly, as it was commonly tradition in Ancient Egypt, he inherited his offices and ranks from his father. Menkheperraseneb was married to a woman named Ta-nj-Iwnw (also read Ta-Iwnw). More details about his family are not known.

Office and Career 
Menkheperraseneb held high official positions, he was Member of the elite, Hereditary noble, Mayor, Royal seal-bearer, Overseer of the king's granaries, Overseer of the foreign lands, Eye of the treasure house and High Priest of Amun.

His tomb inscription shows Menkheperraseneb in several scenes as he supervises the arrival of delegations from Crete, Hatti and Syria. The visitors bring precious trade ware, such as carpets, donkeys and other stuff.

Tomb 
Menkheperraseneb I. was buried in Thebes, in the tomb TT86. Until recently, it was believed that Menkheperraseneb was the owner of two tombs, TT86 and TT112, but Egyptologist Peter Dorman was able to show genealogical discrepancies within the family trees around Menkheperraseneb. The tomb inscriptions of TT86 reveal that Menkheperraseneb had a nephew, who was also called Menkheperraseneb, but married to a different woman, Nebet-ta. Thus, Menkheperraseneb I was obviously interred in TT86 and Menkheperreseneb II in TT112.

References

14th-century BC clergy
Priests of the Eighteenth Dynasty of Egypt
Officials of the Eighteenth Dynasty of Egypt
Theban High Priests of Amun
Ancient Egyptian overseers of foreign lands